Eupelmidae is a family of parasitic wasps in the superfamily Chalcidoidea. The group is apparently polyphyletic, though the different subfamilies may each be monophyletic, and may be elevated to family status in the near future. As presently defined, there are over 905 described species in 45 genera. The larvae of the majority are primary parasitoids, commonly on beetle larvae, though many other hosts are attacked, including spiders, and details of the life history can be variable (e.g., some attack eggs and others are hyperparasites). They are found throughout the world in virtually all habitats.

They are somewhat variable in appearance, though a fair number of species are relatively easy to separate from other Chalcidoidea by the possession of a medially concave mesonotum. They also have the unusual tendency to arch the body strongly upwards when dead, with the head and metasoma often nearly touching above the thorax.

Genera

Anastatus
Arachnophaga
Archaeopelma
Argaleostatus
Australoodera
Balcha
Brasema
Calosota
Calymmochilus
Cervicosus
Coryptilus
Ecnomocephala
Enigmapelma
Eopelma
Eueupelmus
Eupelmus
Eusandalum
Eutreptopelma
Lambdobregma
Lecaniobius
Licrooides
Lutnes
Macreupelmus
Merostenus
Mesocomys
Metapelma
Neanastatus
Omeganastatus
Ooderella
Oozetetes
Paraeusandalum
Paranastatus
Pentacladia
Phenaceupelmus
Phlebopenes
Psomizopelma
Reikosiella
Rhinoeupelmus
Tanythorax
Taphronotus
Tineobiopsis
Tineobius
Uropelma
Xenanastatus
Zaischnopsis

Extinct genera
†Propelma

External links
Universal Chalcidoidea Database

 
Apocrita families